Raffaellino is a given name. Notable people with the name include:

 Raffaellino del Colle, Italian Mannerist painter active mostly in Umbria
 Raffaellino del Garbo, Florentine painter of the early Renaissance
 Raffaellino da Reggio, Italian Mannerist style painter from Reggio Emilia

See also 

 Raffaello (disambiguation)

Italian masculine given names